Ali Wehbi is an extreme runner and racer who was the first Lebanese and Arab to complete the 4 Deserts race. Pushing the boundaries of endurance running since 2004, Ali Wehbi has spent the past 16 years proving to the world that there is no limit to what a man can achieve with his own body strength and an unrelenting sense of determination.

Ali Wehbi 
As an extreme runner, he is thus far unequaled in his achievements and has wholly dedicated himself and his ability to fundraising and promoting humanitarian causes. Spurred on by the pain he experienced following his mother tragic loss in her battle with cancer, Wehbi has made it his calling to do all that he possibly can to aid in the fight against cancer, along with many other life-threatening issues and illnesses.

Racing
Ali Wehbi is the first Lebanese and currently only Arab to complete the 4 Deserts race. Pushing the boundaries of endurance running since 2004, Ali Wehbi has spent the past 14 years proving to the world that there is no limit to what a man can achieve with his own body strength and an unrelenting sense of determination.

In April 2013, Ali Wehbi ran the North Pole Marathon, Adventure Racing at the Top of the World in -40 C, to promote climate change awareness and to celebrate the ICRC (International Committee of the Red Cross) by planting the Red Cross emblem in the North Pole. The flag was a "gift" from the Lebanese Red Cross to the ICRC for its 150th birthday.

Personal life
Ali Wehbi works for  ICT Consultating and is a father of 2. It was not until he lost his mother to a battle with cancer that he began to question his desires and lifestyle and began his quest to become an athlete in the world's most difficult races.

References

Running the country's perimeter, for peace The Daily Star, 25 August 2012
 WEHBI GIVES LEBANON a bigger ACHIEVEMENT  Executive Business Magazine, 22 March 2011
 Le coureur des déserts Ali WEHBI apporte une victoire de plus au Liban  Libnanews, 21/03/2011

External links
 Ali Wehbi Web Site  Official site
 Adventurer runs across Lebanon and dedicates his record to people with autism
 Ali Wehbi, coureur de l’extrême franco-libanais, va courir 1000 km avec une jeune autiste rémoise. Lunion, France
 Ali Wehbi, coureur de l’extrême franco-libanais, va courir 1000 km avec une jeune autiste rémoise - Lardennais, France
 [ https://executive-bulletin.com/other/ali-wehbi-scores-new-guinness-record-in-adidas-ultra-boost-shoes Ali Wehbi Scores New Guinness Record with adidas Ultra Boost shoes]
 From Beirut to the North Pole (من بيروت الى القطب الشمالي ..)
 Ali Wehbi The Lebanese desert runner presentation
 Ali Wehbi Lebanese Coast Run

Lebanese ultramarathon runners
Living people
Lebanese sportspeople
Recipients of the Order of Merit (Lebanon)
Knights of the National Order of the Cedar
Lebanese male marathon runners
Male ultramarathon runners
Year of birth missing (living people)